In mathematics, a universal space is a certain metric space that contains all metric spaces whose dimension is bounded by some fixed constant. A similar definition exists in topological dynamics.

Definition

Menger stated and proved the case  of the following theorem. The theorem in full generality was proven by Nöbeling.

Theorem:

Nöbeling went further and proved:

Universal spaces in topological dynamics

Consider the category of topological dynamical systems  consisting of a compact metric space  and a homeomorphism . The topological dynamical system  is called minimal if it has no proper non-empty closed -invariant subsets. It is called infinite if . A topological dynamical system  is called a factor of  if there exists a continuous surjective mapping  which is equivariant, i.e.  for all .

Similarly to the definition above, given a class  of topological dynamical systems,  is universal for  if each member of  embeds in  through an equivariant continuous mapping. Lindenstrauss proved the following theorem:

Theorem: Let .

The results above implies  . The question was answered by Lindenstrauss and Tsukamoto who showed that   and Gutman and Tsukamoto who showed that  .

See also
 Universal property
 Urysohn universal space 
 Mean dimension

References

Mathematical terminology
Topology
Dimension theory
Topological dynamics